Makhdoom Syed Ali Raza Shah (7 June 1946 – 8 November 2015) is a Pakistani politician who was a Member of the Provincial Assembly of the Punjab, from 2013 until his death in 2015.

Political career
He was elected to the Provincial Assembly of the Punjab in 1977 Pakistani general election.

He was re-elected to the Provincial Assembly of the Punjab as a candidate of Islami Jamhoori Ittehad in 1988 Pakistani general election.

He was re-elected to the Provincial Assembly of the Punjab in 1990 Pakistani general election.

He was re-elected to the Provincial Assembly of the Punjab in 1993 Pakistani general election.

He was elected to the National Assembly of Pakistan as well.

He was re-elected to the Provincial Assembly of the Punjab as a candidate of Pakistan Muslim League (Nawaz) from Constituency PP-89 (Toba Tek Singh-VI) in 2008 Pakistani general election.

He was re-elected to the Provincial Assembly of the Punjab as a candidate of Pakistan Muslim League (Nawaz) from Constituency PP-89 (Toba Tek Singh-VI) in 2013 Pakistani general election.

References

1946 births
2015 deaths
Punjab MPAs 1977
Punjab MPAs 1988–1990
Punjab MPAs 1990–1993
Punjab MPAs 1993–1996
Punjab MPAs 2008–2013
Punjab MPAs 2013–2018
Pakistan Muslim League (N) MPAs (Punjab)